Taiwanese Southern Min Recommended Characters is a set of three lists of Taiwanese Hokkien characters, numbering 700 in total, which were published by the Taiwan Ministry of Education between 2007 and 2009 recommending which Chinese characters to use when writing Taiwanese Hokkien with Chinese characters.

Categories of characters
Root characters (本字): Characters closest in meaning and pronunciation to ancient definitions from rime dictionaries such as Fanqie, for example 山 mountain, 水 water, 天 heaven. Some Taiwanese Hokkien characters are consistent with ancient Chinese, for example 箸 ("chopsticks"; 筷子 in Standard Mandarin), 行 ("walk", 走 in Standard Mandarin) and 食 ("eat", 吃 in Standard Mandarin).
Semantic reading characters (訓用字): If the root character is uncertain, then use the Standard Mandarin Vernacular Chinese equivalent that is closest in pronunciation and meaning to the Taiwanese Hokkien morpheme, for example 戇 (gōng), 挖 (óo/ué).
Phonetic borrowing characters (借音字): If the root character is uncertain and there are no close equivalent morphemes in Standard Mandarin, characters with similar sounds that have gained widespread acceptance in literature can be used, for example 嘛 (mā, "also"), 佳哉 (ka-tsài, "fortunately"), 磅空 (pōng-khang, "tunnel").
Orthodox characters (傳統習用字): Some morphemes have root characters, however there are also a large number of semantic reading characters or phonetic borrowing characters that are more commonly used, resulting in the root characters becoming obscure and rare. In this case, the more commonly used characters should be used rather than the orthodox characters, for example 你 (lí, "you"; equivalent root character 汝), 人 (lâng, "person"; equivalent root character 儂).
Combined sound characters (合音字): As a result of a lack of consensus among writers regarding word use, some monosyllable Taiwanese Hokkien morphemes are still written with equivalent polysyllable phrases, for example 落去 (lueh), 佗位 (tueh), 昨昏 (tsa̋ng), 啥人 (siáng). However, some common homophonous characters have become widely adopted over the bisyllabic equivalent, for example 阮 (originally 我人), 莫 (originally 毋愛), 袂 (originally 無會).

Examples

See also
 Dictionary of Frequently-Used Taiwan Minnan

External links
 臺灣閩南語推薦用字 700字詞 by New Taipei City Department of Education

References

Hokkien writing system